The 2021–22 Delaware State Hornets men's basketball team represented Delaware State University in the 2021–22 NCAA Division I men's basketball season. The Hornets, led by first-year head coach Stan Waterman, played their home games at Memorial Hall in Dover, Delaware as members of the Mid-Eastern Athletic Conference.

Previous season
In a season limited due to the ongoing COVID-19 pandemic, the Hornets finished the 2020–21 season 3–16, 1–11 in MEAC play to finish in fourth place in the Northern division. They failed to qualify for the MEAC tournament. 

On April 1, 2021, the school fired head coach Eric Skeeters after three seasons at Delaware State. On June 3, the school named high school coach Stan Waterman the team's new head coach.

Roster

Schedule and results

|-
!colspan=12 style=| Exhibition

|-
!colspan=12 style=| Non-conference regular season

|-
!colspan=12 style=| MEAC regular season

|-
!colspan=9 style=| MEAC tournament

Sources

References

Delaware State Hornets men's basketball seasons
Delaware State Hornets
Delaware State Hornets men's basketball
Delaware State Hornets men's basketball